The list of shipwrecks in 1827 includes some ships sunk, wrecked or otherwise lost during 1827.

January

February

March

April

May

June

July

August

September

October

November

December

Unknown date

Notes
 "Winter" means 21 December 1826 - 20 March 1827.

References

1827